Marianelys Pérez García (born 15 April 2002) is a Dominican footballer who plays as a midfielder for Academia 5 de Abril and the Dominican Republic women's national team.

International career
Pérez has appeared for the Dominican Republic at the 2020 CONCACAF Women's Olympic Qualifying Championship qualification.

References 

2002 births
Living people
Dominican Republic women's footballers
Women's association football midfielders
Dominican Republic women's international footballers